Ch'amakani (Aymara ch'amaka dark, darkness, -ni a suffix to indicate ownership, "the one with dark color", also spelled Chamacane) is a mountain  northeast of the Apolobamba mountain range at the border of Bolivia and Peru. On the Bolivian side it is located in the La Paz Department, Franz Tamayo Province, Pelechuco Municipality, and on the Peruvian side it lies in the Puno Region, Putina Province, Sina District. Ch'amakani is situated south of the mountain Yanaqucha, west of Chawpi Wayq'u and north of Yawa Yawa.

References 

Mountains of La Paz Department (Bolivia)
Mountains of Puno Region
International mountains of South America
Bolivia–Peru border
Mountains of Peru